Patrick Joseph Gorry (14 July 1896 – 23 October 1965) was an Irish Fianna Fáil politician. A farmer, he was first elected to Dáil Éireann as a Fianna Fáil Teachta Dála (TD) for the Leix–Offaly constituency at the September 1927 general election. He was re-elected at the 1932 general election but lost his seat at the 1933 general election. 

He re-gained his seat at the 1937 general election and was re-elected at each subsequent general election until he lost his seat at the 1951 general election. He was elected to the 7th Seanad in 1951 on the Agricultural Panel. He was defeated at the 1954 Seanad election.

References

1896 births
1965 deaths
Fianna Fáil TDs
Members of the 6th Dáil
Members of the 7th Dáil
Members of the 9th Dáil
Members of the 10th Dáil
Members of the 11th Dáil
Members of the 12th Dáil
Members of the 13th Dáil
Members of the 7th Seanad
Irish farmers
Fianna Fáil senators